The Chinese Taipei Basketball Association (CTBA) is the governing body of basketball in Taiwan (Republic of China). Its official name in Chinese is Republic of China Basketball Association. The CTBA is a member of FIBA and FIBA Asia.

The federation is responsible for the Chinese Taipei men's national basketball team and the Chinese Taipei women's national basketball team and their Under-age teams.

History 
 1954: Founded as Republic of China Basketball Committee.
 1973: Changed to Republic of China Basketball Association.
 1974: Suspended from the FIBA due to naming problems.
 1977: Held the first William Jones Cup.
 1981: Re-admitted to FIBA.

References

Basketball in Taiwan
Basketball governing bodies in Asia
Basketball
1954 establishments in Taiwan
Sports organizations established in 1954